The Kateri (Katery) hydro electric power station is located in Nilgiris, Tamil Nadu, India. It is a series of dams and a power house with four 125 KW generators and one 500 KW. The site was the first hydro-electric plant in India, and powers the Cordite Factory at Aruvankadu.

A reservoir with a capacity of 12.25 million cubic feet was created by the first dam, which was completed in 1902. A second reservoir with capacity of 10  million cubic feet was formed by the second dam, completed in 1916.

Other hydro-electric systems
The following are the other hydro-electric systems in the Nilgiris district:

Pykara hydro-electric systems
Moyar hydro-electric systems
Kundah hydro-electric systems
Mukurthi micro power house
Maravakandy Power House

See also

Kundah hydro-electric power house
Maravakandy hydro-electric Power House
Moyar hydro-electric Power House
Pykara
Katary Falls

References

Hydroelectric power stations in Tamil Nadu
Nilgiris district
1902 establishments in India
Dams completed in 1902
Dams completed in 1916
Energy infrastructure completed in 1902